Iris Bohnet (born 1966) is a Swiss behavioral economist, and the Albert Pratt Professor of Business and Government and the Academic Dean at the Kennedy School of Government at Harvard University. Her work focuses primarily on issues of gender, trust, and social preferences.

Early life and education 
A native of Lucerne, Switzerland, Bohnet studied at the chair of Bruno S. Frey and received her PhD in Economics from the University of Zurich in 1997, then spent a year as a research fellow at the Haas School of Business at the University of California, Berkeley from 1997-1998. She joined the Harvard Kennedy School as an assistant professor in 1998 and was made full professor in 2006.

Career 
Bohnet is the director of the Women and Public Policy Program, co-chair of the Behavioral Insights Group, and the faculty chair of the executive program, "Global Leadership and Public Policy for the 21st Century" for the World Economic Forum's Young Global Leaders at Harvard Kennedy School.

Bohnet has served as the Academic Dean of Harvard Kennedy School as well as on the boards or advisory boards of the Graduate Institute for International and Development Studies, Switzerland; the Vienna University for Business and Economics, Austria; and the University of Lucerne, Switzerland.

Bohnet is the author of What Works: Gender Equality by Design. The book, acclaimed by The Financial Times, The Wall Street Journal, and The Washington Post, among others, offers evidence-based solutions to overcome gender bias in classrooms and boardrooms, in hiring and promotion, benefiting businesses, governments, and society. It was included in lists of 2016's top books by Forbes, The Financial Times, LinkedIn, and The Washington Post.

In 2016, Bohnet has been a featured speaker at Google Book Talks, the LSE, the OECD, SXSW, UNESCO, UNWomen, the World Bank, and the World Economic Forum, among others.

Bohnet's work has been featured in media outlets around the world, including the Atlantic, the BBC, Bloomberg News, Boston Globe, The Economist, Financial Times, Forbes, Handelsblatt, Harvard Business Review, Huffington Post, NPR, Neue Zürcher Zeitung, New York Times, PBS, Tages-Anzeiger, Swiss Television, Wall Street Journal, The Washington Post, Wired and WirtschaftsWoche.

Her academic work has been published in many top-ranked peer-reviewed journals, including The American Economic Review, American Political Science Review, the Quarterly Journal of Economics, and Management Science, among many others.

Other activities 
In addition to her academic work, Bohnet is on the board of directors of Credit Suisse Group, as well as on the advisory boards of EDGE and Applied, as well as numerous academic journals. She is a member of the Global Agenda Council on Behavior of the World Economic Forum.

When the United Kingdom assumed the presidency of the G7 in 2021, Bohnet was appointed by the United Kingdom's Minister for Women and Equalities Liz Truss to a newly formed Gender Equality Advisory Council (GEAC) chaired by Sarah Sands.

Recent publications 

 Bohnet, van Geen & Bazerman, 2016. When Performance Trumps Gender Bias, Joint Versus Separate Evaluation. Management Science 62 (5), 1225-1234.
 Bohnet, 2016. How to Take the Bias Out of Job Interviews. Harvard Business Review. April 18.

Personal life 
Bohnet and her husband, Michael Zürcher (an attorney), have two children, the sons Dominik and Luca. She used to compete in synchronized swimming, loves scuba diving, and generally enjoys aquatic activities.

References

External links
 

Swiss economists
Swiss women economists
Harvard Kennedy School faculty
Swiss women academics
Living people
University of Zurich alumni
1966 births